Nasi Lemuni is a rice dish originating from Malaysia. It's traditionally eaten as a confinement dish as it is believed that vitex trifolia, the herb, can enhance blood flow, balance hormones, and improve one's digestion. It's similar to nasi lemak but it's cooked with an herb known as daun lemuni (English: Vitex trifolia leaves).

Sometime people eat it with sambal, fried chicken, anchovies, cucumber, and hard boiled egg. It is suitable to eat during breakfast and lunch.

See also
Nasi dagang
Nasi lemak
Nasi kerabu

References

External links
 Nasi Lemak Warna Hitam? Nasi Lemuni, Hidangan Warisan Penuh Khasiat | Resipi Tok (in Malay)  at Destinasi TV
 Apa Rasa Nasi Lemuni Ni? Betul Ke PAHIT MERENGUT? | Resepi Tok (in Malay)  at Destinasi TV

Malay cuisine
Malaysian rice dishes